Statistics of Nadeshiko League Cup in the 2018 season.

Division 1

Overview
Nippon TV Beleza won the championship.

Results

Qualifying round

Group A

Group B

Final
Nippon TV Beleza 1-0 INAC Kobe Leonessa
Nippon TV Beleza won the championship.

Division 2

Overview
Iga FC Kunoichi won the championship.

Results

Qualifying round

Group A

Group B

Final
Sfida Setagaya FC 1-4 Iga FC Kunoichi
Iga FC Kunoichi won the championship.

References

Nadeshiko League Cup
2018 in Japanese women's football